Christiansholm Fortress (Christiansholm festning) was a Norwegian fortress built to defend the city of Kristiansand.

Background
The fortress was finished in 1672 and formed a part of King Christian IV's plan for defense of Kristiansand  when the city was founded in 1641.  The architect of the fortress was quartermaster general Willem Coucheron. It was built on an islet, about 100 yards from shore.  Today the fortress is connected to the mainland.

One of the very few remaining larger warships under Danish-Norwegian command was the ship of the line HDMS Prinds Christian Frederik with 70 cannons that was in the eastern harbor of Kristiansand. Captain Stopford on board HMS Spencer ordered to sail   toward the city  and announced in a letter that he wanted to take over the HDMS Prinds Christian Fredrik, and threatened to open fire on the city if the ship were not disclosed. When the ships approached, they were met by fierce resistance from Christiansholm Fortress. The attack was repulsed by massive gunfire  and the British sailed instead to the abandoned Fredriksholm Fortress,  which was blown up and destroyed.

The fortress was decommissioned by royal decree  during June 1872 as part of a major redevelopment of fortifications across the nation.

Today, Christiansholm is a tourist attraction by the Kristiansand Boardwalk and venue for a variety of cultural events and festivities. It is now owned by the municipality and is a site used principally for recreation and cultural events.

Gallery

References

Other sources
Holte, Leiv Christiansholm og Retranchementet  (Kristiansand kommune. 1941)

External links 

Christiansholm Fortress attractions
Christiansholm Fortress and sights

Forts in Norway
Buildings and structures in Kristiansand
Fortifications of Kristiansand
Tourist attractions in Kristiansand
Tourism in Kristiansand